James Hughes (29 August 1909 – January 1966) was an English footballer, who played as a forward.

Career
Hughes was born in Coxhoe. He was a regular in the Army and served in the Second Battalion Northumberland Fusiliers. When stationed at Catterick, he played several games for York City reserves as an amateur in the 1933–34 season.

After leaving the forces, he signed professionally for York in August 1934. He joined Hartlepools United in 1935 after making 17 appearances and scoring 5 goals for York. He returned to York in the same year after making eight appearances and scoring three goals in the league for Hartlepool. He established himself in the side and played in all of the FA Cup ties of the 1936–37 and 1937–38 seasons. He rejoined Hartlepools in 1939 after making 109 appearances and scoring 28 goals in his second spell for York.

During World War II, he was a prisoner of war in Germany.

References

1909 births
1966 deaths
Footballers from County Durham
English footballers
Association football forwards
York City F.C. players
Hartlepool United F.C. players
World War II prisoners of war held by Germany
British Army personnel of World War II
People from Coxhoe
British World War II prisoners of war